The Seven Deadly Sins is a studio recording of the Kurt Weill opera of the same name by British singer Marianne Faithfull, released in 1998.

Background and recording
Marianne Faithfull had already performed The Seven Deadly Sins live at St. Anne's Cathedral in Brooklyn, but it was only after working with Dennis Russell Davies on 20th Century Blues that the idea of recording the opera came to her. Davies agreed to collaborate again with her, and the album was recorded in June 1997 at the Vienna Konzerthaus with Davies conducting the Vienna Radio Symphony orchestra.

The recording also includes other songs by Weill & Brecht like the "Alabama Song" and songs from The Threepenny Opera, which Marianne Faithfull also performed live in 1992 at the Dublin Gate Theater, playing the role of the prostitute Jenny and interpreting the famous Pirate Jenny song.

Track listing

Personnel
 Marianne Faithfull – vocals
 Dennis Russell Davies – Conductor
 Recorded with the Vienna Radio Symphony orchestra

References

1998 albums
Marianne Faithfull albums
Seven deadly sins in popular culture